Sandra Whittleston (born 2 February 1951) is a New Zealand former swimmer. She was coached by New Zealand's first professional swimming coach, Bert Cotterill, and she competed in three events at the 1968 Summer Olympics.

References

1951 births
Living people
New Zealand female swimmers
Olympic swimmers of New Zealand
Swimmers at the 1968 Summer Olympics
Sportspeople from Napier, New Zealand